The 1997 Bandy World Championship was contested between 9 men's bandy playing nations.  The championship was played in Sweden on 1–9 February 1997. The Netherlands participated again, after having skipped the tournament for the last couple of times. Sweden won the championship.

The ball for the first game of the championship was ceremonially handed over by H.M. King Carl XVI Gustaf of Sweden.

Squads

Group A

Premier tour
 1 February
 Finland – Sweden 3–11
 Kazakhstan – Russia 6–13
 2 February
 Kazakhstan – Finland 2–7
 Sweden – Norway 5–2
 3 February
 Russia – Finland 6–2
 Norway – Kazakhstan 7–7
 4 February
 Norway – Russia 3–3
 Sweden – Kazakhstan 15–4
 5 February
 Norway – Finland 4–5
 Russia – Sweden 7–5

Group B

Premier tour
 2 February
 Hungary – USA 0–12
 Canada – Netherlands 9–0
 4 February
 Hungary – Canada 4–10
 Netherlands – USA 1–13
 5 February
 Hungary – Netherlands 9–3
 Canada – USA 2–5

Final tour

Quarter-finals	
 7 February
Norway – Kazakhstan 2 – 5
USA – Finland 0 – 13

Match for 5th place
 8 February
 Norway – USA 7–1

Match for 8th place
 8 February
 Hungary – Netherlands 5–3

Semifinals
 8 February
 Russia – Kazakhstan 12–3
 Sweden – Finland 8–5

Match for 6th place
 9 February
 USA – Canada 5–1

Match for 3rd place
 9 February
 Finland – Kazakhstan 7–3

Final
 9 February
 Sweden – Russia 10–5

References

1997
1997 in bandy
1997 in Swedish sport
International bandy competitions hosted by Sweden
February 1997 sports events in Europe